This is a list of Irish women Test cricketers. A Test match is an international cricket match between two of the leading cricketing nations. The list is arranged in the order in which each player won her Test cap. Where more than one player won her first Test cap in the same Test match, those players are listed alphabetically by the surname the player was using at the time of the match. This list is correct to the end of the Test against Pakistan in 2000, which as of November 2006 is the last Test match Ireland had played.

Key

General
*: an innings that ended not out
Mat: number of matches played
Batting
Inn: number of innings
NO: number of times an innings ends not out
Runs: number of runs scored by batsman/off bowler's bowling
HS: highest score
Avg: batting average
100/50: number of centuries and half-centuries scored

Bowling
Overs: number of overs bowled
Mdn: number of maiden overs (overs off which no runs were scored)
Wkt: number of wickets taken
BB: best bowling figures
Avg: bowling average
5wI: number of times 5 wickets were taken in an innings
Fielding
Ca: number of catches taken
St: number of stumpings made

Players
Statistics are correct as of the Ireland women's only Test match, against Pakistan on 30 July 2000.

See also
List of Ireland women ODI cricketers
List of Ireland women Twenty20 International cricketers

References

 
Irish, Test
Cricketers
Women Test